The South Eastern Main Line is a major trunk railway in the south east of England, linking London with Dover. This is a detailed diagram of the line.

Sources 
 

Rail transport in England